This is the discography of Portuguese singer Salvador Sobral. In August 2016, Sobral released his debut studio album Excuse Me, which includes the singles "Excuse Me" and "Nem Eu". The album peaked at number one on the Portuguese Albums Chart. He won the Eurovision Song Contest 2017 for Portugal with the song "Amar pelos dois". He gave Portugal its first ever win in the contest since its debut in 1964, ending the longest winless run by a country in Eurovision history (53 years). In November 2017, he released his debut live album, Excuse Me (Ao Vivo). The album peaked at number two on the Portuguese Albums Chart. In March 2019, he released his second studio album Paris, Lisboa, which includes the singles "Mano a Mano", "Cerca del Mar" and "Anda Estragar-me os Planos". The album peaked at number one on the Portuguese Albums Chart.

Albums

Studio albums

Live albums

Singles

Other charted songs

References

Discographies of Portuguese artists